Winnacunnet High School is an American public high school in Hampton, New Hampshire. It serves students in grades 9 through 12 who live in Hampton, Seabrook, North Hampton, South Hampton, and Hampton Falls. Students from South Hampton attend either Amesbury High School or Winnacunnet High School. Winnacunnet is a Native American word that means "beautiful place in the pines." William McGowan has been the principal since 2010.

History
On October 30, 1957, the groundbreaking began for the construction of the school. Winnacunnet High School opened for the first time in the fall of 1958 with an attendance of 474 students. Before 1958, area students attended the Hampton Academy and High School, a junior-senior high school that still exists today as the junior high school for Hampton. The official Winnacunnet High dedication ceremony took place on October 26, 1958. The school has undergone construction and renovations in recent years.

The school was in the national news in 1990 when Pamela Smart conspired with 15-year-old sophomore student William "Billy" Flynn and, according to him, convinced him to murder her husband Greg Smart on May 1, 1990. Smart did not work at Winnacunnet High School but at the SAU 21 building across the street, located on Winnacunnet school grounds. Smart was convicted of first-degree murder in March 1991, and sentenced to life in prison without the possibility of parole. She is currently serving her sentence in a maximum security prison in New York State.

Notable alumni
 Charles Rocket, comedian
 Renny Cushing New Hampshire state representative
 Maura Healey, governor of Massachusetts since 2023
 Steve Merrill, governor of New Hampshire 1992-1994

See also 

 List of high schools in New Hampshire

References

External links 
 Winnacunnet High School website

Educational institutions established in 1957
Schools in Rockingham County, New Hampshire
Public high schools in New Hampshire
Hampton, New Hampshire
1957 establishments in New Hampshire